Tešanovci is a village immediately east of Moravske Toplice in the Prekmurje region of Slovenia.

Chapel
There is a small chapel in the village with a three-storey belfry, built in the early 20th century.

Notable people
Ferenc Novák (1791–1836), writer

References

External links
Tešanovci on Geopedia

Populated places in the Municipality of Moravske Toplice